The Chief of the Staff of The Salvation Army is a Commissioner appointed by the General of The Salvation Army as the second in command internationally.  The Chief of the Staff is stationed at International Headquarters in London.

The office of Chief of the Staff was created in 1880 by General William Booth. The first officer to take the position was his son, Bramwell Booth, in 1881.

The Chief of the Staff also summons all Commissioners and Territorial Commanders of The Salvation Army to form a High Council to elect a new general when a vacancy exists.

General Andre Cox appointed Commissioner Brian Peddle to become the 26th Chief of the Staff of The Salvation Army effective on 1 November 2015.

Lists of Chief of the Staff
(1881–1912) Bramwell Booth
(1912–1919) T. Henry Howard
(1919–1929) Edward Higgins
(1929–1937) Henry W. Mapp
(1937–1939) John McMillan
(1939–1943) Alfred G. Cunningham
(1943–1946) Charles Baugh
(1946–1953) John J. Allan
(1953–1957) Edgar J. Dibden
(1957–1961) William J. Dray
(1961-1961) Norman F. Duggins
(1961–1969) Erik Wickberg
(1969–1974) Arnold Brown
(1974–1977) Arthur E. Carr
(1977–1982)  W. Stanley Cottrill
(1982–1987) Caughey Gauntlett
(1987–1991) Ron A. Cox
(1991–1993) Bramwell Tillsley
(1993–1999) Earle Maxwell
(1999–2002) John Larsson
(2002–2006) Israel Gaither
(2006–2010) Robin Dunster
(2010–2013) Barry Swanson
(2013) Andre Cox
(2013-2015) William A. Roberts
(2015-2018) Brian Peddle
(2018-Present) Lyndon Buckingham

References

External links 
The Salvation Army International Heritage Centre

The Salvation Army
Methodist ecclesiastical offices
 Chief of the Staff